August Rosenbaum (born 1987 in Copenhagen, Denmark) is a Danish composer, record producer and jazz pianist.

Biography 
Composer August Rosenbaum has won two Danish Music Awards, performed at the acclaimed Sónar Festival, and has been shortlisted for both the Nordic Music Prize and the National Danish Critics’ Award. His album Vista from 2017 and EP Rasa (2018) were produced by Grammy nominated producer Robin Hannibal and won the award for "Best Alternative Album" at the 2018 Danish Music Awards. In 2021 Rosenbaum exhibited the large scale installation Celeste at Copenhagen Contemporary together with artists Lea Guldditte Hestelund, Ea Verdoner and Cæcilie Trier. The score for the exhibition was released on the Copenhagen-based label Posh Isolation.

Rosenbaum is also known for collaborations with artists like Quadron, Rhye and MØ, Sonic Youth's Kim Gordon and visual artist Jesper Just. He has commissioned works for film, theatre and performances at a.o. Palais De Tokyo, The Metropolitan Museum of Art, Brooklyn Academy of Music and The Royal Danish Ballet.

Discography

Soundtrack

Music for film, performance, exhibitions 
Celeste by August Rosenbaum, Lea Guldditte Hestelund, Ea Verdoner, Cæcilie Trier, 2021, Copenhagen Contemporary.
Seminarium by Jesper Just, 2021, Gl. Holtegaard / Galerie Perrotin Tokyo 
The City Cecilie Bahnsen campaign film (2021, Paris Fashion Week) 
The Summit  Cecilie Bahnsen campaign film (2020, Paris Fashion Week)
En Helt Almindelig Familie feature film by Malou Reymann (2020, Nordisk Film)
Corporealities by Jesper Just, 2020, Galerie Perrotin, New York.
Servitudes by Jesper Just, 2019, Palais de Tokyo, Paris. Metropolitan Museum of Art, New York. Maat, Lisbon. Charlottenborg Kunsthal, Copenhagen
Nomad (video) by Jasper Spanning (2018, Prxjects, New Land)
Circuits by Jesper Just (2018, Galleri Nicolai Wallner, Copenhagen. 2020, SMK - the Danish National Gallery, Copenhagen)
Interpassitivities by Jesper Just (2018, BAM, New York, The Royal Danish Ballet)
 Credo Part II ft. Coco O (video) by Jasper Spanning (2017, Prxjects, New Land)
Nebula (video) by Andreas Emenius (2017, Prxjects, SPRING Nordisk Film)
 Simon - a portrait of Simon Rosenbaum by Bente Milton (2017, DR)
King Lear by Peter Langdal (2016, The Royal Danish Theatre)
 In Your Arms feature film by Samanou A. Sahlstrøm (2015, Meta Film)
 Interruption by Malou Reymann (2015, Nordisk Film)
 Eliten by Thomas Daneskov (2015, Nordisk Film)
Black Rider by Robert Wilson, dir. Katrine Wiedemann (2015, Betty Nansen)
Laughter in The Dark by Kirsten Delholm (2015, Hotel Pro Forma)
 What Difference Does It Make by Ralf Schmerberg (2014, Red Bull Music Academy)
 Katalog 1 by Jasper Spanning (2014, JS)
 16.5 Time by Malou Reymann (2013, Danish Film Institute)
 Talk Before It's Too Late by Daniel Kragh Jakobsen (2012, Bubbles)
 Dem Man Elsker by Malou Reymann (2012, Danish Film Institute)
 Les Amours Perdues by Samanou A. Sahlstrøm (2011, Den Danske Filmskole)
 Backwater by Thomas Daneskov (2011, Killit Film)
 Sirens of Chrome by Jesper Just (2010, Jesper Just)

Awards and nominations 

Danish Music Awards

 2018 - Alternative album of the year (Jazz, Alternative) - Vista (Won)

Danish Theatre Critics Award

 2017 - Best Performance (Nominated for Interpassivities)
Göteborg Film Festival - Dragon Award

 2015 - Best Nordic Film (Winner - In Your Arms)

Danish Music Awards
 2014 - Best Jazz Composer (Nominated)
 2010 - Best New Jazz Artist (Won)
Danish Critics Choice Award
 2014 - Musician of the year (Nominated)
Nordic Music Prize
 2014 - Best Album (Shortlisted)
 2010 - Best Album (Shortlisted)
Danish Publishers Award
 2014 - Best Jazz Composer (Nominated)
Danish Arts Council
 2011-2013 - Den Unge Elite (Won)
Léonie Sonning Music Prize
 2011 - Young Talent Award (Won)

References

External links

Avant-garde jazz musicians
Danish jazz pianists
Danish jazz composers
1987 births
Living people
Musicians from Copenhagen
21st-century Danish musicians
21st-century pianists
21st-century jazz composers